= Vamos al Cine =

Venezuelan television show (2005–2011)

Vamos al Cine is an independent Venezuelan television production created by Turiamo Producciones, whose original version was broadcast on Televisión Venevisión from 2005 to 2011.

Vamos al Cine consists of rotating sections dedicated to the camera behind the audiovisual industry, with interviews of actors of national and international relevance, as well as a section of farandula and spectacle in which the latest news relevant to these issues would be given.

Vamos al Cine had a section dedicated to live comedy, featuring the debut of the character Butaquito, portrayed by Colombo-Venezuelan artist Franartur Duque.
